Derbyshire County Cricket Club in 1951 was the cricket season when the English club Derbyshire had been playing for eighty years. It was their forty-seventh  season in the County Championship and they won five matches and lost seven to  finish eleventh in the County Championship.

1951 season

Guy Willatt was in his first full year as captain. He had been appointed in the previous year but because of injury was substituted by Pat Vaulkhard for 1950. His appointment ended a period of uncertainty since the end of the Second World War, when apart from Edward Gothard, no one was available to captain for more than one year.

Derbyshire played 28 games in the County Championship, and one match against the touring South Africans. They won five matches altogether, but a disproportionate number of matches were drawn. Charlie Elliott was top scorer and C Gladwin took most wickets with 123.

The club retained a virtually unchanged squad with only one newcomer -  Edwin Smith who played on for 20 years.

Matches

{| class="wikitable" width="100%"
! bgcolor="#efefef" colspan=6 | List of  matches
|- bgcolor="#efefef"
!No.
!Date
!V
!Result 
!Margin
!Notes
 |- 
|1
| 5 May 1951
|  WorcestershireCounty Ground, New Road, Worcester  
|bgcolor="#FFCC00"|Drawn
|
|   Don Kenyon 100;  
|- 
|2
| 9 May 1951 
| Leicestershire Grace Road, Leicester  
|bgcolor="#FFCC00"|Drawn
|
|   TA Hall 5-57 
|- 
|3
| 12 May 1951
| Warwickshire  Edgbaston, Birmingham 
|bgcolor="#FFCC00"|Drawn
| 
|    
|- 
|4
|16 May 1951  
|  Sussex    County Ground, Derby  
|bgcolor="#FFCC00"|Drawn
| 
|    Langridge 200; AEG Rhodes 5-23 
|- 
|5
|19 May 1951 
| Yorkshire Queen's Park, Chesterfield 
|bgcolor="#FF0000"|Lost 
|7 wickets
 |    
|- 
|6
|26 May 1951
|  Gloucestershire  County Ground, Derby 
|bgcolor="#FF0000"|Lost 
|67 runs
 |    DC Morgan 6-93
|- 
|7
|2 Jun 1951 
| Glamorgan   Cardiff Arms Park 
|bgcolor="#FF0000"|Lost 
|Innings and 120 runs
|   Davies 146; Parkhouse 107; Jim McConnon 7-69 and 7-84 
|- 
|8
|6 Jun 1951 
| Hampshire Queen's Park, Chesterfield 
|bgcolor="#FFCC00"|Drawn
|
 |    Rogers 151; C Gladwin 6-108 
|- 
|9
|9 Jun 1951  
| Northamptonshire  County Ground, Northampton 
|bgcolor="#FFCC00"|Drawn
| 
|    Oldfield 140 
|- 
|10
|13 Jun 1951  
| Somerset Agricultural Showgrounds, Frome   
|bgcolor="#00FF00"|Won 
|125 runs 
|    J Redman 7-23 
|- 
|11
|16 Jun 1951  
|  Gloucestershire   Wagon Works Ground, Gloucester  
|bgcolor="#FFCC00"|Drawn
| 
|    Crapp 105; AC Revill 137 
|- 
|12
|20 Jun 1951   
| Kent  County Ground, Derby 
|bgcolor="#FFCC00"|Drawn
|
 |    HL Jackson 5-90; Wright 5-90
|- 
|13
|23 Jun 1951  
| Lancashire    Queen's Park, Chesterfield  
|bgcolor="#FF0000"|Lost 
|15 runs 
|    Washbrook 103;  
|- 
|14
|27 Jun 1951  
| Essex  Gidea Park Sports Ground, Romford  
|bgcolor="#FFCC00"|Drawn
| 
|    CS Elliott 166; C Gladwin  5-65 and 5-44; Bailey 6-44; 
|- 
|15
|4 Jul 1951  
|Middlesex    Park Road Ground, Buxton  
|bgcolor="#FFCC00"|Drawn
| 
|    A Hamer165; 
|- 
|16
|7 Jul 1951 
| HampshireUnited Services Recreation Ground, Portsmouth  
|bgcolor="#00FF00"|Won 
|113 Runs
 |   AC Revill 104; C Gladwin 7-74; HL Jackson 5-34 
|- 
|17
|14 Jul 1951  
| Lancashire   Old Trafford, Manchester  
|bgcolor="#FFCC00"|Drawn
| 
|  C Gladwin 5-42 and 5-76; Brian Statham 5-20
|- 
|18
|18 Jul 1951  
|Derbyshire v South Africans   County Ground, Derby  
|bgcolor="#FF0000"|Lost 
|8 wickets
|    
|- 
|19
|21 Jul 1951
| Glamorgan   Queen's Park, Chesterfield 
|bgcolor="#FF0000"|Lost 
|Innings and 94 runs 
|    Muncer 107, 5-34 and 5-23
|- 
|20
|25 Jul 1951 
| Kent   Cheriton Road Sports Ground, Folkestone  
|bgcolor="#00FF00"|Won 
|177 runs 
|    DB Carr 103; Ridgway 6-44; C Gladwin 7-55; AEG Rhodes 6-57 
|- 
|21
|28 Jul 1951
| Nottinghamshire  Rutland Recreation Ground, Ilkeston  
|bgcolor="#00FF00"|Won 
| Innings and 114 runs
|    Willatt 111; AC Revill 123; C Gladwin 8-40 
|- 
|22
|1 Aug 1951 
| Yorkshire  St George's Road, Harrogate  
|bgcolor="#FFCC00"|Drawn
| 
|    Wilson 120; Watson 108; Fred Trueman 6-59; Bob Appleyard 5-42 
|- 
|23
|4 Aug 1951 
|  Warwickshire County Ground, Derby   
|bgcolor="#FFCC00"|Drawn
| 
|   Eric Hollies 7-67 
|- 
|24
|8 Aug 1951   
|  Worcestershire<small> Queen's Park, Chesterfield
|bgcolor="#FF0000"|Lost 
|139 runs 
 |   C Gladwin 6–108; Howorth 5-33 and 5-32; E Smith 8-21; Perks 5-33 
|- 
|25
|11 Aug 1951 
| Nottinghamshire   Trent Bridge, Nottingham  
|bgcolor="#FFCC00"|Drawn
|
|    Clay 108; Cox 6-30 
|- 
|26
|15 Aug 1951  
|  Surrey County Ground, Derby
|bgcolor="#FFCC00"|Drawn
|
|    CS Elliott 121; C Gladwin 5-80 
|- 
|27
|18 Aug 1951
|  Sussex   The Saffrons, Eastbourne  
|bgcolor="#FFCC00"|Drawn
|
|    Hubert Doggart 126; David Sheppard 183; James Langridge 5-84 
|- 
|28
|22 Aug 1951
| Leicestershire   Ind Coope Ground, Burton-on-Trent  
|bgcolor="#00FF00"|Won 
|Innings and 23 runs 
|    A Eato 5–14; Sperry 5-60; HL Jackson 5-34; AEG Rhodes 5-49
|- 
|29
|25 Aug 1951 
| Essex   Ind Coope Ground, Burton-on-Trent  
|bgcolor="#FFCC00"|Drawn
|
|   T Smith 5-22; C Gladwin 7-55
|- 
|

Statistics

County Championship batting averages

Additionally John Eggar appeared in the match against the  South Africans.

County Championship bowling averages

Wicket Keepers
GO Dawkes 	Catches 51, Stumping 9

See also
Derbyshire County Cricket Club seasons
1951 English cricket season

References

1951 in English cricket
Derbyshire County Cricket Club seasons